Fernand-Gustave-Gaston Labori (April 18, 1860 – March 14, 1917) was a French attorney.  He was born in Reims and educated at the Faculty of Law of Paris. In his professional life, he defended the accused in some of the most prominent political cases of his day. Among his noted clients was Alfred Dreyfus, who was eventually acquitted of treason. During the Dreyfus trial, Labori was the victim of an assassination attempt which hospitalized him for a week. The attacker was never identified.

Legal career
Labori was elected second secrétaire de Conférence du barreau de Paris, and he was the defence counsel for:
 Anarchist Auguste Vaillant, who threw a bomb into the French Chamber of Deputies, injuring 20 people, and who was sentenced to death
 Émile Zola in 1898 in the Dreyfus trial
 Captain Alfred Dreyfus, at his court martial in Rennes in 1899
 Thérèse Humbert, in the case of the Crawford inheritance, who pretended to be an heir of American millionaire Robert Crawford; the case sometimes was described as 'the swindle of the century'
 Henriette Caillaux in 1914, who was the wife of former Prime Minister of France Joseph Caillaux

His speeches were regarded as masterpieces of forensic eloquence.

Death
He is buried at the Montparnasse Cemetery.

References

Bibliography
 Labori, ses notes manuscrites, sa vie. Editor V. Attinger. Author Marguerite Labori, 1947, Paris,
 Labori, pour Zola, pour Dreyfus, contre la terre entière, un avocat. Editor L. Audibert, Authors Thierry Lévy and Jean-Pierre Royer, Paris 2006,

External links

 

 Portrait du centre d'études du 19e siècle français - Université de Toronto
 Etat des Archives de Fernand Labori
 Liste biliographique des principales plaidoiries sur Criminocorpus - site du CNRS
 Portrait sur La vie rémoise

1860 births
1917 deaths
People associated with the Dreyfus affair
People from Reims
19th-century French lawyers
20th-century French lawyers